Umkhonto we Sizwe (Spear of the Nation) is a reggae album by Prince Far I, released in 1984 and which he was recording when he was murdered in 1983. The album is named in honor of the fight of the militant wing of the ANC.

The album was engineered by Overton "Scientist" Brown and Sylvan Morris. Backing vocals were by Jah Lloyd, Winston Jarrett and The Viceroys.

Track listing
All tracks composed by Michael Williams and Roy Cousins
"Survival"
"Survival Version"
"Ask Ask"
"Ask Ask Version"
"African Queen"
"African Queen Version"
"Stop the War"
"Stop the War Version"
"Jerry Doghead"
"Jerry Doghead Version"
"Special Request"
"Special Request Version"

References

1984 albums
Prince Far I albums
Albums published posthumously
UMkhonto we Sizwe